Barnabás Biben (born 19 November 2003) is a Hungarian professional footballer who plays for Szentlőrinc on loan from MTK Budapest FC.

Career statistics

.

References

External links

2003 births
Living people
People from Budapest
Hungarian footballers
Hungary youth international footballers
Association football midfielders
MTK Budapest FC players
III. Kerületi TUE footballers
Szentlőrinci SE footballers
Nemzeti Bajnokság I players
Nemzeti Bajnokság II players